I'd Rather Suck My Thumb is the fourth album by American blues guitarist Mel Brown recorded in 1969 for the Impulse! label.

Reception
The Allmusic review awarded the album 2 stars.

Track listing
All compositions by Mel Brown except as indicated
 "I'd Rather Suck My Thumb" - 5:33
 "Scorpio" - 6:30
 "Eighteen Pounds of Unclean Chitlings" - 11:10
 "You Got Me Hummin'" -  4:15
 "Do Your Thing" (Charles Wright) - 5:36
 "Troubles" - 5:20
 "Dixie" (Dan Emmett) - 4:27
Recorded in Los Angeles, California on March 21, 1968

Personnel
Mel Brown - guitar, vocals
Matthew Kelly - harmonica
Clifford Coulter - organ, electric piano
Johnny Carswell - organ
Bob West - electric bass 
Gregg Ferber - drums

References

Impulse! Records albums
Mel Brown (guitarist) albums
1970 albums